Jean Raoul Robert Rochefort (29 April 1930 – 9 October 2017) was a French actor. He received many accolades during his career, including an Honorary César in 1999.

Life and career
Rochefort was born on 29 April 1930 in Paris, France, to Breton parents. He was educated at the Lycée Pierre Corneille in Rouen.

Rochefort was nineteen years old when he entered the Centre d'Art Dramatique de la rue Blanche. Later he joined the Conservatoire National. After completing his national service in 1953, he worked with the Compagnie Grenier Hussenot as a theatre actor for seven years. There he was noticed for his ability to play both drama and comedy. He then became a television and cinema actor, and also worked as director.

After some supporting roles in Cartouche, Captain Fracasse and in Marvelous Angelique, Rochefort played his first big role with Annie Girardot as his wife and Claude Jade as his daughter in Hearth Fires in 1972. In this drama, he starred as a man who leaves his family for ten years before returning. In this film he played with 41 years a family father of adult children (the young Claude Jade was already 23). To appear older, he grew a moustache, his trademark, which he had removed only once in 1996 for Ridicule.

Four years after Hearth Fires he was the leading star of the midlife crisis comedy An Elephant Can Be Extremely Deceptive as a man who risks his married life with Danièle Delorme for an affair with Anny Duperey. Thanks to the success of this film, Rochefort achieved big popularity. In 1972, he starred opposite Pierre Richard as Chief of Counter-Espionage Louis Toulouse in the Yves Robert comedy Le Grand Blond avec une chaussure noire, a role he reprised in the 1974 sequel Le Retour du grand blond, also directed by Robert. In 1998, he starred as "Fernand de Morcerf" opposite Gerard Depardieu in the mini-series Le Comte de Monte Cristo.

In his thirties during the shooting of Cartouche, he discovered his passion for horses and equestrianism. He was a horse breeder since then and owned Le Haras de Villequoy. His passion led him to become a horse consultant for French television in 2004. He won two César Awards: in 1976, Best Supporting Actor for Que la fête commence; and in 1978, Best Actor for Le Crabe-tambour.

In the eighties, he became the narrator of the French version of Welcome to Pooh Corner, replacing Laurie Main. This made him popular with children at the time and Disney hired him to record several audio versions of their classic movies. In the 1990s, he returned to comedy with Les Grands Ducs where he played alongside two other actors of his generation with a similar career, Philippe Noiret and Jean-Pierre Marielle.

He was set to play the lead role in The Man Who Killed Don Quixote, after being found as "the perfect Quixote" by director Terry Gilliam. Rochefort learned to speak English just for the part. Unfortunately, amongst other production problems, he began suffering from a herniated disc. Unable to film for months, production was cancelled. A documentary, Lost in La Mancha, was made about the failed production.

In 1960, he married Alexandra Moscwa, with whom he had two children: Marie (1962) and Julien (1965). With actress-filmmaker Nicole Garcia, he also had a son Pierre. Through his second marriage with Françoise Vidal, he had two children, Louise (1990) and Clémence (1992).

Death
Rochefort died on 9 October 2017 at the age of 87.

Awards
Rochefort won many awards throughout his career, most notably three César Awards: Best Supporting Actor for Que La Fête Commence, Best Actor for Le Crabe-Tambour and an honorary prize in 1999. He was nominated for many more awards.

Filmography

Theater 
1953: Azouk by Alexandre Rivemale, staging Jean-Pierre Grenier, Théâtre Fontaine
1953: L'Huitre et la perle by  William Saroyan, staging Jean-Pierre Grenier, Théâtre Fontaine
1953: Les Images d'Épinal by Albert Vidalie, staging Jean-Pierre Grenier, Cabaret La Fontaine des Quatre-Saisons
1954: Responsabilité limitée by Robert Hossein, staging Jean-Pierre Grenier, Théâtre Fontaine
1954: L’Amour des quatre colonels by Peter Ustinov, adaptation Marc-Gilbert Sauvajon, staging Jean-Pierre Grenier, Théâtre Fontaine
1957: Romanoff et Juliette by Peter Ustinov, staging Jean-Pierre Grenier, Théâtre Marigny 
1957: L’Amour des quatre colonels by Peter Ustinov, staging Jean-Pierre Grenier, Théâtre de l'Ambigu-Comique
1958: Tessa by Jean Giraudoux from the work of Basil Dean and Margaret Kennedy, staging Jean-Pierre Grenier, Théâtre Marigny 
1958: L’Étonnant Pennypacker by Liam O'Brien, staging Jean-Pierre Grenier, Théâtre Marigny
1960: Champignol malgré lui by Georges Feydeau and Maurice Desvallières, staging Jean-Pierre Grenier, Théâtre Marigny
1960: Le Comportement des époux Bredburry by François Billetdoux, staging by the author, Théâtre des Mathurins
1960: Génousie by René de Obaldia, staging Roger Mollien, TNP Théâtre Récamier  
1961: Loin de Rueil by Maurice Jarre and Roger Pillaudin from the work of Raymond Queneau, staging Maurice Jarre and Jean Vilar, TNP Théâtre national de Chaillot 
1962: Frank V by Friedrich Dürrenmatt, staging André Barsacq, Théâtre de l'Atelier
1964: Cet animal étrange by Gabriel Arout from the work of Anton Tchekhov, staging Claude Régy, Théâtre Hébertot 
1965: La Collection and L’Amant by Harold Pinter, staging Claude Régy, Théâtre Hébertot
1966: La prochaine fois je vous le chanterai by James Saunders, staging Claude Régy, Théâtre Antoine
1969: Le Prix by Arthur Miller, staging Raymond Rouleau, Théâtre Montparnasse
1970: Un jour dans la mort de Joe Egg by Peter Nichols, staging Michel Fagadau, Théâtre de la Gaîté-Montparnasse 
1971: C'était hier by Harold Pinter, staging Jorge Lavelli, Théâtre Montparnasse
1982: L'Étrangleur s'excite by Éric Naggar, staging Jean Rochefort, Théâtre Hébertot
1985: Boulevard du mélodrame by Juan Pineiro and Alfredo Arias, staging Alfredo Arias, National Dramatic Center of Aubervilliers
1988: Une vie de théâtre by David Mamet, adaptation Pierre Laville, staging Michel Piccoli, Théâtre des Mathurins
1988: La femme à contre-jour by Éric Naggar, staging Jean Rochefort, Théâtre des Mathurins
1988: Histoire du soldat (The Soldier's Tale) by Igor Stravinsky, staging Jean Rochefort, Théâtre de Paris
1988: Le Carnaval des animaux musique Camille Saint-Saëns
1989: Une vie de théâtre by David Mamet, staging Michel Piccoli
1991: Histoire du soldat (The Soldier's Tale) by Igor Stravinsky, staging Jean Rochefort
1995: Oraison funèbre sur la mort de Condé by Jacques Bénigne Bossuet, music Jean-Baptiste Lully, direction Hervé Niquet, Royal Chapel of the Château de Versailles
1996: Le Petit Tailleur music Tibor Tibor Harsányi and Le Carnaval des animaux music Camille Saint-Saëns, Théâtre du Châtelet, Bruxelles 
1998: Art by Yasmina Reza, staging Patrice Kerbrat, with Pierre Vaneck and Jean-Louis Trintignant, Théâtre Hébertot
2004: Heureux ? sketches by Fernand Raynaud, with Bruno Fontaine, Comédie des Champs-Élysées
2006: Mousquetaires de Richelieu, show of the Puy du Fou
2007: Entre autres, a one-man show with Lionel Suarez playing accordion, in which he pays a tribute to the authors who influenced him, from Roland Barthes to Jean Yanne, notwithstanding Fernandel, Verlaine, Boby Lapointe or Primo Levi, Théâtre de la Madeleine
2007 at the Olympia: where he sang "Félicie aussi", a song by Fernandel, during the last three concerts of Vincent Delerm's tour 30 and 31 May 2007 and 1 June 2007

Audio book 
 Le Pont de la rivière Kwaï (The Bridge over the River Kwai) by Pierre Boulle

Notes

External links

 
 

1930 births
2017 deaths
20th-century French male actors
21st-century French male actors
French National Academy of Dramatic Arts alumni
Best Actor César Award winners
Best Actor Lumières Award winners
Best Supporting Actor César Award winners
César Honorary Award recipients
French documentary filmmakers
French male film actors
French male stage actors
French male television actors
French people of Breton descent
Lycée Pierre-Corneille alumni
Male actors from Paris